Queen's Park Rangers Ladies Football Club was a leading women's football team in England.

The club was founded in 1969, and in 1970 joined the new Home Counties League.  In 1975/76, it reached the final of the Women's FA Cup, losing 2-1 to Southampton Women's F.C. after extra time.  Paddy McGroarty scored the team's goal, and it was the first time highlights of the match were shown on BBC1.  In 1976/77, it again played Southampton in the cup final, and on this occasion, defeated them 1-0, to become the first London team to take the trophy.  The 1977–78 WFA Cup saw them again reach the final against Southampton, but suffer an 8-2 defeat.  The team dissolved before the end of the decade.

A new Queen's Park Rangers Women's Football Club was later established, which in 2001 merged into a new Queen's Park Rangers L.F.C.

References

1969 establishments in England
Defunct women's football clubs in England
Association football clubs established in 1969
Football clubs in London